Mesocoelopus is a genus of death-watch and spider beetles in the family Ptinidae. There are about six described species in Mesocoelopus.

Species
These six species belong to the genus Mesocoelopus:
 Mesocoelopus brevistriatus Leiler, 1979
 Mesocoelopus castelsi Pic, 1922
 Mesocoelopus collaris Mulsant & Rey, 1864
 Mesocoelopus creticus Fairmaire, 1880
 Mesocoelopus leileri Israelson, 1976
 Mesocoelopus substriatus Schilsky, 1900

References

Further reading

External links

 

Bostrichoidea
Articles created by Qbugbot